Phu Toei National Park (อุทยานแห่งชาติพุเตย) is a national park, with an area of 198,422 rai ~  in Dan Chang District of Suphan Buri Province, Thailand. It has been the 86th national park since 30 September 1998.

On 26 May 1991, Lauda Air Flight 004 crashed in the land that later became the park after one of the Boeing 767's thrust reversers deployed in flight.

The park is visited by about 300 people monthly during the high season. The Daily Xpress of Singapore states that the park "goes down as one of Thailand's least known and least visited national parks. So much so, that most Suphan Buri folk don't even realise that their province has a national park."

A dominant feature of the park is Khao Thevada ('Angel Mountain'), a  mountain that is the highest in the province. The mountain is on the borders of Kanchanaburi and Uthai Thani Provinces.

Television episodes
 PPTV HD36 discussed Phu Toei National Park on Smile by the Highway, 26 March 2020, in "Conquer the top of the mountain.".

See also

 List of national parks of Thailand
 List of mountains in Thailand
 List of Protected Areas Regional Offices of Thailand

References

National parks of Thailand
Protected areas established in 1987
1987 establishments in Thailand
Geography of Suphan Buri province
Tourist attractions in Suphan Buri province
Dawna Range